Reshterud (also Romanized as Reshterūd; also known as Reshteh Rūd) is a village in Rostamabad-e Shomali Rural District, in the Central District of Rudbar County, Gilan Province, Iran. At the 2006 census, its population was 470, in 132 families.

References 

Populated places in Rudbar County